Michael Schofield was the head coach for the water polo team of the United States Naval Academy from 1985 to 2013.

A graduate of the University of Pittsburgh, Schofield was captain of that school's water polo team. He joined the staff of the Naval Academy in 1982, and was promoted to the head coach's position in 1985. Under his direction, the team has won the CWPA's Eastern Division championship six times, and played in the NCAA tournament eleven times. He was named National Coach of the Year in 2004.  He retired from coaching in the fall of 2013.

In 2001, he was inducted into the USA Water Polo Hall of Fame.

References

External links
 
 Navy profile

Year of birth missing (living people)
Living people
Navy Midshipmen men's water polo coaches
Pittsburgh Panthers men's water polo players
American water polo coaches